Craig McKay may refer to:

Craig McKay (film editor), American film editor
Craig McKay (cartoonist) (born 1966), American freelance illustrator
Craig McKay (actor) (born 1973), English actor

See also
Craig Mackay (1927–2020), Canadian speed skater